James Wesley Pruden Jr., known as Wesley Pruden (December 18, 1935 – July 17, 2019) was an American journalist and author. He was the editor-in-chief of The Washington Times from 1992 until his retirement in 2008.

Early life 

Pruden was born in 1935 in Little Rock, Arkansas, his family having lived in the state for several generations. His father, James Wesley Pruden, Sr. (1908-1979), was a Southern Baptist minister, the pastor of the Grace Baptist Church, and a radio evangelist.  Some of his sermon titles are "Why I Became a Baptist After Preaching for the Nazarenes for Ten Years", "Why Every Baptist Should Get Drunk Once", and "Who's in Hell". The senior Pruden was also the president of the Little Rock chapter of the White Citizens' Council, a segregationist group that battled integration throughout the 1950s and 1960s.

Newspaper career 
Pruden's first job in the newspaper business was in 1951 when, as a tenth grade student at Little Rock Central High School, he worked nights as a copyboy at the since defunct Arkansas Gazette, where he later became a sportswriter and an assistant state editor. After high school, he attended a two-year college, Little Rock Junior College, now incorporated into the University of Arkansas at Little Rock.

In 1956, he began working at the Commercial Appeal in Memphis, Tennessee.  In 1963, he joined the National Observer, a national weekly published by Dow Jones & Co., for which he covered national politics and the civil rights movement.  In 1965, he was assigned to cover the Vietnam War. For the next decade, he was a foreign correspondent, based in Saigon, Hong Kong, Beirut, and London.  The National Observer ceased publication in 1977.

Between 1976 and 1982, Pruden worked on a novel, a satire for which he could not find a publisher. In 1982, he joined the Washington Times, four months after the paper began, as chief political correspondent.  He became assistant managing editor in 1983, managing editor in 1985, and editor-in-chief in 1992. He retired in January 2008, and became editor-in-chief-emeritus. He continued to write a twice-weekly column on politics and national affairs for The Times.

Pruden is known for his coverage of President Ronald Reagan about whom he wrote:

"When Ronald Reagan speaks, the people never hear the politician saying, 'blah blah blah.' They hear a man who talks like they do, saying things that sound like common sense. Such is the essence of the 'Reagan mystique,' the aura of power that has carried the nation along with the man who is arguably the most effective president since Franklin D. Roosevelt."

In 1991, he won the H.L. Mencken Prize for excellence in writing and commentary.

Under Pruden's editorship, every Saturday The Washington Times ran a full page of stories on the American Civil War, the only daily newspaper in the United States to do so.  Pruden called it "probably our single most popular feature", and noted that "There are more books published on the Civil War than on any other American topic."  Pruden said that "the Civil War page has just as many stories about glorifying the Union as it does the Confederacy." Soon after Pruden retired as editor-in-chief, the Times announced that the Civil War page would be expanded to include coverage of all America's wars and would be renamed "America at War."

Controversies 

Pruden's retirement from his position as Editor-in-Chief of The Washington Times in 2008 was widely seen as involuntary. The Columbia Journalism Review describes him as having been "pushed out amid allegations that he allowed racism to fester in the newsroom."

On November 17, 2009, Pruden published an opinion piece in The Washington Times titled "Obama bows, the nation cringes," where he set forth his thoughts on what he considered President Obama's breaches of etiquette committed on his tour of Asia, such as bowing to Emperor Akihito of Japan. In the article, he expressed the opinion that since President Obama was "sired by a Kenyan father, born to a mother attracted to men of the Third World and reared by grandparents in Hawaii," he "has no natural instinct or blood impulse for what [America] is about." A number of commentators criticized the column as racist.

In 2013, Pruden returned to The Washington Times as part of "a wide-ranging shakeup" following the death of Reverend Sun Myung Moon, the newspaper's founder. Having him as an editor again was viewed by many as damaging to The Washington Times'''s reputation. The Columbia Journalism Review quoted an unnamed senior Washington Times official as saying that Pruden's return was "a huge blow to the influence and credibility of the paper."

References

 External links 
 The Washington Times'': Pruden on Politics
 

1935 births
2019 deaths
American newspaper editors
American male journalists
The Washington Times people
Writers from Little Rock, Arkansas
Writers from Memphis, Tennessee
Writers from Washington, D.C.
University of Arkansas at Little Rock alumni
Journalists from Arkansas
Journalists from Tennessee